Stygobromus harai, commonly called Hara's cave amphipod, is a troglomorphic species of amphipod in family Crangonyctidae. It is endemic to Tuolumne County, California in the United States.

References

Freshwater crustaceans of North America
Crustaceans described in 1974
Cave crustaceans
harai
Endemic fauna of California